Myriogramme is a genus of red alga comprising approximately 34 species.

Species
The species currently recognised are:
M. alliacea
M. caespitosa
M. carnea
M. cartilaginea
M. ciliata
M. costata
M. crispata
M. dilabida
M. distromatica
M. divaricata
M. eckloniae
M. goaensis
M. gunniana
M. heterostroma
M. kerguelensis
M. kjellmanianum
M. kylinii
M. livida
M. melanesiensis
M. minuta
M. multilobata
M. nightingaliensis
M. okhaënsis
M. polyneura
M. prostrata
M. pulchra
M. quilonensis
M. repens
M. smithii
M. spectabilis
M. tristromatica
M. undulata
M. unistromaticum
M. variegata

References

External links
Images of Myriogramme at Algaebase

Delesseriaceae